Justin Gimelstob and Byron Talbot were the defending champions, but Talbot did not partner this year.  Gimelstob partnered Patrick Galbraith.

Galbraith and Gimelstob won the title, defeating Marius Barnard and Brent Haygarth 5–7, 7–5, 6–3 in the final.

Seeds

  David Adams /  John-Laffnie de Jager (semifinals)
  Andrew Kratzmann /  Fabrice Santoro (semifinals)
  Patrick Galbraith /  Justin Gimelstob (champions)
  Piet Norval /  Kevin Ullyett (quarterfinals)

Draw

Draw

External links
 Draw

Nottingham Open
1999 ATP Tour